Jorge Iván Bolaño (born 15 May 1998) is an Argentine professional footballer who plays as a midfielder for Juventud Antoniana.

Career
Bolaño's career started with Tigre in the Primera División. He was promoted into their first-team midway through 2017–18, making his professional debut on 26 January 2018 during a home defeat to Banfield. He made seven further appearances in his opening campaign.

In August 2021, Bolaño joined Croatian club NK BSK Bijelo Brdo. He returned to Argentina in March 2022, after signing with Juventud Antoniana.

Personal life
In August 2020, it was confirmed that Bolaño had tested positive for COVID-19 amid the pandemic; he was asymptomatic.

Career statistics
.

References

External links

1998 births
Living people
Argentine footballers
Argentine expatriate footballers
People from San Fernando de la Buena Vista
Sportspeople from Buenos Aires Province
Association football midfielders
Argentine Primera División players
Primera Nacional players
First Football League (Croatia) players
Club Atlético Tigre footballers
Juventud Antoniana footballers
Argentine expatriate sportspeople in Croatia
Expatriate footballers in Croatia